Mick Mullane, Jr. (born 9 September 1955) is an Australian former professional rugby league footballer, who was a member of the Cronulla-Sutherland Sharks rugby league team. Mullane played fullback, and played in the 1978 grand final.

Mullane is the son of Mick Mullane Sr., who played for Newtown and St. George from 1947 to 1953; the younger brother of Greg Mullane (Canterbury and Cronulla); and the father of Jye Mullane.

References

External links
 http://www.rugbyleagueproject.org/players/mick-mullane-jnr/summary.html

1955 births
Living people
Australian rugby league players
Cronulla-Sutherland Sharks players
Rugby league fullbacks
Place of birth missing (living people)